Laurent Barré (May 30, 1886 – August 26, 1964) was a Quebec author, politician and Cabinet Minister for 16 years.

He was born in Ange-Gardien, near Granby, Quebec, the son of Louis Barré and Arzélias Préfontaine. Barré worked as a blacksmith and a farmer until 1943. He was the founder of a catholic farmer's union in the 1920s and worked for several other farmer's organizations in the Granby and Yamaska regions.

He was first elected in Rouville in the Legislative Assembly of Quebec in 1931 as a member of the Quebec Conservative Party after a first unsuccessful attempt in the 1927 elections. He remained as MLA until 1939 as a member of the Union Nationale starting in 1935. He returned to office in 1944 and was re-elected for five more terms, although shortly after his re-election in 1960 and the lost of the Union Nationale to the Quebec Liberal Party, he resigned from his seat. He served as Maurice Duplessis' Minister of Agriculture from 1944 to 1960.

He also published two books entitled Bertha et Rosette and Conscience de Croyants in 1929-1930.

Books
 Bertha et Rosette (1929)
 Conscience de Croyants (1930)
Président fondateur de l'Union Catholique des cultivateurs (U.C.C.)

References

External links
 

1886 births
1964 deaths
Trade unionists from Quebec
Conservative Party of Quebec MNAs
Union Nationale (Quebec) MNAs
Canadian non-fiction writers in French
People from Granby, Quebec
Canadian male non-fiction writers
French Quebecers